O'Donnell + Tuomey is an architectural practice based in Dublin, Ireland, described by the authors of Architects Today as one of "the godfathers of contemporary Irish architecture". O'Donnell and Tuomey were the recipients of the 2015 Royal Gold Medal, awarded by the RIBA.

The practice was established in 1988 by Sheila O'Donnell and John Tuomey, who had both previously worked for Stirling Wilford in London.   The pair formed part of Group 91 Architects, the masterplanners for the regeneration of Dublin's Temple Bar district in the early 1990s. Both directors teach at University College Dublin and have lectured at schools of architecture in Europe, the UK and USA, including Harvard Graduate School of Design, Princeton University, Cambridge University and the AA Architectural Association School of Architecture. In 2010 they were elected Honorary Fellows of the American Institute of Architects. In 2013 the practice received the ICON Architecture Practice of the Year Award.

When asked about their work on the occasion of their Royal Gold Medal ceremony, Tuomey stated: "I fundamentally think that [we believe architecture is] to give shape to everyday routines of society, or to make a society out of those everyday routines. To have a building feel like it's part of the fabric of social life is second nature to us."

Notable projects

The practice's Irish Film Centre and Gallery of Photography projects won the Downes Medal, in 1992 and 1996 respectively. They subsequently designed a number of other notable buildings, including the Lewis Glucksman Gallery at University College Cork, the Irish installation at the Venice Biennale 2004, and the Ranelagh Multidenominational School, which won the RIAI Triennial Gold Medal in 2005. Five of their projects were shortlisted for Stirling Prize: Ranelagh Multidenominational School in 1999, Lewis Glucksman Gallery in 2005, the Lyric Theatre in Belfast in 2011, An Gaeláras Irish Language Centre in 2012  and London School of Economics Saw Swee Hock Students' Centre in 2014.

Bibliography
 O'Donnell + Tuomey, Princeton Architectural Press, 2006,

References

External links 
 

Architecture firms of Ireland